The 54th edition of the KNVB Cup started on January 9, 1972. The final was played on May 11, 1972: Ajax beat FC Den Haag 3–2 and won the cup for the seventh time.

Teams
 All 18 participants of the Eredivisie 1971–72
 14 participants of the Eerste Divisie 1971–72

First round
The matches of the first round were played on January 9, 1972.

E Eredivisie; 1 Eerste Divisie

Round of 16
The matches of the round of 16 were played on February 11, 13 and 20, 1972.

Quarter finals
The quarter finals were played on March 15 and 29, 1972.

Semi-finals
The semi-finals were played on April 11 and 12, 1972.

Final

Ajax also were the champions of the Eredivisie, thereby taking the double. They would participate in the European Cup, so finalists FC Den Haag would participate in the Cup Winners' Cup.

See also
 Eredivisie 1971–72
 Eerste Divisie 1971–72

External links
 Netherlands Cup Full Results 1970–1994 by the RSSSF

1971-72
1971–72 domestic association football cups
KNVB Cup